Gigan in Iran may refer to:
 Gigan, Hormozgan (گيگن - Gīgan)
 Gigan, Sistan and Baluchestan (گيگان - Gīgān)